Homer Gilliam Phillips (1878–1931) was an American lawyer in St. Louis  who was born in Pettis County, Missouri. He is mostly known as an African-American  Republican political figure in St. Louis and as the namesake of Homer G. Phillips Hospital.

The son of a minister and former slave, he was orphaned in childhood and raised by his aunt. He grew up in Sedalia. He studied law at Howard University.

He was married to Ida Perle Alexander, an actress. He secured $1 million to constructing a new hospital for African Americans on the city's north side, Homer G. Phillips Hospital.

Phillips was murdered in 1931; the suspects in his murder were acquitted and the case remains unsolved.

References

External links 
 

1878 births
1931 deaths
African-American lawyers
Lawyers from St. Louis
Male murder victims
Murdered African-American people
20th-century American lawyers
People murdered in Missouri
20th-century African-American people
People from Sedalia, Missouri
Howard University alumni
Missouri Republicans